Mussig is a commune in the Bas-Rhin department in Alsace in north-eastern France. Successive known names carried by the village were: Moussich, Mosich (1370) and Musich (1453) before becoming Musselburgh. The etymological origin is probably to be found in the existence of wetlands and swamps are conducive to the formation of foam. Until the 19th century was practiced widely growing flax and hemp, woven at home or delivered to the weavers in the valley of Sainte-Marie-aux-Mines, this is still in the early twentieth century.

See also
 Communes of the Bas-Rhin department

References

Communes of Bas-Rhin
Bas-Rhin communes articles needing translation from French Wikipedia